Nor-Ferjer was a joint venture ferry company created by Hardanger Sunnhordlandske Dampskipsselskap (HSD) and Stavangerske in 2005 to compete for public service obligation on car ferry routes outside Rogaland and Hordaland, Norway. The company won four contracts for transport before being merged into Tide Sjø in 2007 after HSD, Gaia Trafikk and Stavangerske merged to form Tide.

Fleet

Ferry companies of Møre og Romsdal
Ferry companies of Trøndelag
Transport companies established in 2005
Transport companies disestablished in 2007